The Mystery of the Strange Messages is a children's novel written by Enid Blyton and published in 1957. It is the fourteenth book in the Five Find-Outers series featuring Fatty, Pip, Larry, Daisy, Bets and of course Buster, as well as Mr Goon and his nephew Ern.

References

External links
Enid Blyton Society page

Novels by Enid Blyton
1957 British novels
Methuen Publishing books
1957 children's books